John Smith Archibald (December 14, 1872 – March 2, 1934) was a Canadian architect.

Biography
John Smith Archibald was born in Inverness, Scotland on December 14, 1872. He arrived in Montreal in 1893. He worked as chief architect in Edward Maxwell's cabinet. Archibald and his colleague Charles Saxe then started their own firm until 1915. Archibald was president of the Royal Architectural Institute of Canada 1924-1925 and was elected a fellow in 1930. He built several prominent hotels for Canadian National Railway, including the Windsor Hotel, Château Laurier, Halifax Hotel, and the Hotel Vancouver. He also worked on several projects in Montreal, including the Montreal Masonic Memorial Temple, the Emmanuel Congregational Church, and the École polytechnique de Montréal. Other significant commissions included the Montreal Forum, Baron Byng High School, Elizabeth Ballantyne School, the Queen's University gymnasium and swimming pool in Kingston (1930), and three Montreal hospitals: the Royal Edward Institute, the Montreal Convalescent Hospital, and St. Mary's Hospital.

He died at Montreal General Hospital on March 2, 1934.

Works

See also
List of Quebec architects

References

External links
Canadian Encyclopedia - John Smith Archibald
Finding aid for the John S. Archibald collection, Canadian Centre for Architecture (digitized items)

Canadian architects
1861 births
1934 deaths
Architecture in Canada
Royal Architectural Institute of Canada
Architects from Montreal
Scottish emigrants to Canada